The 2005 European Cadet Judo Championships is an edition of the European Cadet Judo Championships, organised by the International Judo Federation. It was held in Salzburg, Austria from 18 to 19 June 2005.

Medal summary

Medal table

Men's events

Women's events

Source Results

References

External links
 

 U18
European Cadet Judo Championships
European Championships, U18
Judo
Judo competitions in Austria
Judo
Judo, European Championships U18